is a city located in Aomori Prefecture, Japan. , the city had an estimated population of 38,198 in 19493 households, and a population density of 330 persons per km².

Misawa is the location of a large military base, Misawa Air Base, which is under joint operation of the United States Air Force's 35th Fighter Wing, Naval Air Facility, and Japan Air Self-Defense Force's 3rd Fighter Wing. It is also an important US base for signals intelligence and related activities. The city population figures do not include the estimated 10,000 American military personnel and their dependents stationed at Misawa Air Base.

Geography
Misawa is located in the flatlands on the southern shore of Lake Ogawara on the east coast of Aomori Prefecture, facing the Pacific Ocean. The nearest large city is Hachinohe which is 30 to 40 minutes away by car. The surrounding area is mostly rural and scenic. There is some limited nightlife, mostly concentrated around the American air base. Tokyo is an hour away by air, about 3 and a half hours by train, and about 10–12 hours by car. Misawa has well-defined seasons. Though short, autumn is beautiful with pleasant temperatures, late-blooming flowers, and the changing colors of the trees. Winter gets serious in early December, peaks in January and February, and starts fading near the end of March. Strong winds often intensify the cold temperatures. Snowfall is frequent, and in January and February, snow does not melt completely. Icy roads are also a concern as the sunshine will often melt the snow and then as afternoon temperatures cool down, the water from the melted snow and ice refreezes. As the ice and snow clear and the ground dries, dust storms become a hazard near farm fields. In early spring, the winds switch and come from the east off the ocean. Thick sea fog is common in the morning or early evening. May is usually quite pleasant with warm temperatures. The onset of summer usually brings the rainy season. This normally begins in mid-June and continues for an unpredictable period of time. However, it normally clears out around mid to late July. The end of July through August can get quite hot and humid.

Neighboring municipalities 
Aomori Prefecture
Rokunohe
Tōhoku
Rokkasho
Oirase

Climate
The city has a humid continental climate characterized by hot summers and cold winters with heavy snowfall (Köppen climate classification Dfa). The average annual temperature in Misawa is 9.9 °C. The average annual rainfall is 1172 mm with September as the wettest month. The temperatures are highest on average in August, at around 22.6 °C, and lowest in January, at around -1.9 °C. 
<div style="width:70%">

</div style>

Demographics
Per Japanese census data: The population of Misawa has remained relatively stable over the past 40 years.

History
The area around Misawa has been occupied since the Japanese Paleolithic period, and was a major population center for the Emishi people. Numerous Jōmon period remains have been discovered within the borders of Misawa, including within the borders of Misawa Air Base. The area was nominally under control of the Northern Fujiwara in the Heian period, and became part of the holdings granted to the Nanbu clan after the defeat of the North Fujiwara by Minamoto no Yoritomo in the early Kamakura period. The Nanbu established numerous horse ranches, accompanied by a series of numbered fortified settlements in the region. During the Edo period, the area was part of Morioka Domain and was later transferred to the holdings of the subsidiary Shichinohe Domain during the mid-Edo period.. After the Meiji Restoration, the area was settled by many dispossessed ex-samurai from former Aizu Domain.

Per the post-Meiji restoration establishment of the modern municipalities system on 1 April 1889, the village of Misawa was created within Kamikita District through the merger of Misawa and Tengamori hamlets. The area was devastated by a tsunami in March 1896. In 1931, in the first successful nonstop transpacific flight, Clyde Pangborn and Hugh Herndon, in the airplane Miss Veedol, took off from Misawa's Sabishiro Beach and landed in present-day East Wenatchee, Washington in the United States. Coastal areas of Misawa were again devastated by a tsunami in March 1933. An Imperial Japanese Navy Air Service base was established in 1941, and nearby Lake Ogawara was reportedly one of the lakes used by the Imperial Japanese Navy to practice for the attack on Pearl Harbor, due to its shallow depth.  The base was heavily bombed by the United States Navy in 1945, and subsequently occupied by the United States after the surrender of Japan at the end of World War II.

On 11 February 1948, the town of Omisawa was founded through the merger of Misawa village with portions of Rokunohe, Shimoda and Uranodate villages. Misawa Airport was opened on 11 January 1952, with Japan Airlines providing scheduled services to Haneda Airport in Tokyo and Chitose Airport in Hokkaidō. The town was renamed Misawa, and elevated to city status on 1 September 1958. Misawa Airport was closed on 31 March 1965. On 11 January 1966, a large fire destroyed most of the center  of the city. On 19 August 1969, the 51st annual Japanese High School Baseball Championship was held in Misawa. Misawa Airport reopened on 10 May 1975. In the year 2000, Misawa hosted the winter events for the 55th annual National Sports Festival of Japan.

Government
Misawa has a mayor-council form of government with a directly elected mayor and a unicameral city legislature of 18 members. Misawa contributes one member to the Aomori Prefectural Assembly. In terms of national politics, the city is part of Aomori 2nd district of the lower house of the Diet of Japan.

Economy
Misawa serves as a regional industrial and commercial center, with agriculture and commercial fishing playing secondary roles in the local economy. The large foreign presence at Misawa Air Base also makes a large impact on the local economy.

Education
Misawa has seven public elementary schools and five public middle schools operated by the city government and two public high schools operated by the Aomori Prefectural Board of Education.

Transportation

Airport
Misawa Airport

Railway
  Aoimori Railway Company -Aoimori Railway Line

Highway

Sister City relations
 East Wenatchee, Washington, United States from 23 August 2001
 Wenatchee, Washington, United States from 4 October 1981

Local attractions
Misawa Aviation & Science Museum
Hotokenuma wetlands, a Ramsar Site
Shūji Terayama Museum
Lake Ogawara

Festivals
The city of Misawa boasts many festivals throughout the year, such as the cherry blossom festival, located at "Train Park", the Tanabata festival, and the most local, the Kosuimatsuri, or Lake Ogawara Festival. At the Kosuimatsuri , the new Lake Ogawara Queen is crowned; synonymous to "Miss Misawa", which consists of two women from Misawa between the age of 15–25, and one American citizen from Misawa Air Base, of the same age range. Misawa also hosts "Japan Day" within Misawa Air Base, at the base's Collocated Club.  There is also "American Day", occurring generally a week or so after Memorial Day, at which time Japanese and American friendship is strengthened through the festive environment of food vendors and a large parade.

Noted people from Misawa
 Yoko Imai, actress
 Koji Ota, professional baseball player
 Shinobu Kai, gravure model
 Yukio Kakizaki, professional baseball player
 Masaya Kitamura, politician
 Norio Kimura, professional boxer
 Kahoru Kohiruimaki, musician
 Takayuki Kohiruimaki, professional kickboxer
 Kyōichi Sawada, photo journalist
 Akiyoshi Sasaki, professional baseball player
 Takanonami Sadahiro, sumo wrestler
 Yoshimi Tanaka, Japanese Red Army terrorist
 Issei Futamata, voice actor
 Kazusa Okuyama, actress
 ELLY, member of the J-pop boygroup J Soul Brothers.
 Byron Howard, film director

References

External links

 Official Website 
 Misawa Air Base Website

 
Cities in Aomori Prefecture
Populated coastal places in Japan